Doctor Syntax may refer to:

 Dr. Syntax, a comic character created by William Combe and the cartoonist Thomas Rowlandson.
 Doctor Syntax (horse) (1811–1838), British Thoroughbred racehorse and sire
 Doctor Syntax (album), a 2002 album by a Scottish musician Edwyn Collins
 Dr. Syntax (play), 1894 play